Peter Francis Kornicki (born 1 May 1950) FBA is an English Japanologist. He is Emeritus Professor of Japanese at Cambridge University and Emeritus Fellow of Robinson College, Cambridge.

Kornicki was born at Maidenhead on 1 May 1950, the eldest son of Sq/Ldr Franciszek Kornicki and Patience Ceredwin Kornicka (née Williams). He went to schools in Malta, Aden and Cyprus and was then educated at St George's College, Weybridge. He matriculated at Lincoln College, Oxford, initially to read Classics. He graduated with First Class Honours in Japanese with Korean in 1972. He spent the academic year 1972-3 as a Japanese Ministry of Education foreign student at Tokyo University of Education (now Tsukuba University) and then returned to Oxford and in 1975 received an MSc in Applied Social Studies. He then moved to St Antony's College, Oxford to begin work on a DPhil on Japanese literature of the Meiji period. In 1976 he was awarded a Japan Foundation fellowship for study in Japan and spent 18 months at the Research Institute for the Humanities at Kyoto University, studying under Professors Asukai Masamichi and Yoshida Mitsukuni. He taught Japanese at the University of Tasmania from 1978 to 1982, and was subsequently an associate professor at the Research Institute for the Humanities at Kyoto University. In 1985 he came to Cambridge, where he has been a fellow of Robinson College since 1986, and was Deputy Warden from 2008 to 2018. He was President of the European Association for Japanese Studies (EAJS) in 1997-2000.

His main research interest is in the history of the book in Japan, but he is also interested in the lives and work of the British pioneer japanologists Frederick Victor Dickins, William George Aston, Ernest Mason Satow and Basil Hall Chamberlain.

Personal life
In 1975, Kornicki married Catharine Olga Mikolaski. Together they had two children: one daughter and one son. His first wife died in 1995. In 1998, he married Francesca Orsini, an Italian scholar of South Asian literature.

Honours
 Japan Foundation Award, 1992.
 British Academy, Fellow (FBA), 2000.
 Lincoln College, Oxford, Honorary Fellow, 2004.
 Yamagata Bantō Prize, Osaka Prefecture, 2013.

Works
The Book in Japan: A Cultural History from the Beginnings to the Nineteenth Century, Leiden: Brill, 1998. Paperback, University of Hawaii Press, 2000. 
Early Japanese Books in Cambridge University Library: A Catalogue of the Aston, Satow and von Siebold Collections, with N. Hayashi (Cambridge University Press), pp. xx + 520, 1991 
The Cambridge Encyclopedia of Japan, coedited with Richard Bowring (Cambridge University Press), pp. 400, 1993

References

External links
Webpage at the Department of East Asian Studies

1950 births
Living people
Fellows of Robinson College, Cambridge
British Japanologists
English male writers
English people of Polish descent
Fellows of the British Academy